The Norman Hackerman Young Author Award was established in 1982 by The Electrochemical Society (ECS). The award is presented annually for the best paper published in the Journal of the Electrochemical Society for a topic in the field of electrochemical science and technology by a young author or authors. (This award incorporates the Turner Book Prize.)

Recipients of the award are presented with a scroll, cash prize (divided equally among eligible authors), and travel assistance to enable winner(s) to attend the ECS meeting where the award is presented.

This award is named after the chemist Norman Hackerman.

Notable Recipients 

As listed by ECS:
 1994 Hubert A. Gasteiger
 1988 Jennifer A. Bardwell
 1987 Joachim Maier
 1975 Larry R. Faulkner
 1971 M. Stanley Whittingham
 1966 John Newman
 1960 A. C. Makrides
 1953 Jack Halpern
 1948 Michael Streicher
 1941 Edward Adler
 1938 Nathaniel B. Nichols
 1929 William C. Gardiner

See also

 List of chemistry awards

References

Chemistry awards
Electrochemistry